Statistics of the Primera División de México for the 1948–49 season.

Overview
It was contested by 15 teams, and León won the championship and became the first team to win consecutive championships.

Teams

League standings

Results

References
Mexico - List of final tables (RSSSF)

1948-49
Mex
1948–49 in Mexican football